Richard Neville, 5th Earl of Salisbury (1400 – 31 December 1460) was a fifteenth-century English northern magnate. He was the eldest son by the second wife of Ralph Neville, 1st Earl of Westmorland, from whom he inherited vast estates in Yorkshire and the North West of England. He was a loyal Lancastrian for most of his life, serving the king, Henry VI, in France, on the border with Scotland, and in many of the periodic crises of the reign. He finally joined York in his last rebellion in the late 1450s and became a Yorkist leader during the early parts of the Wars of the Roses. This led directly to his death following the Battle of Wakefield in December 1460, when he was captured and subsequently put to death in Pontefract Castle.

Salisbury is one of the leading magnates for whom historians lack information regarding his expenditure on annuities while having some idea as to that on retainers. As the historian Michael Hicks has put it, Salisbury attempted to extend the power and influence of his family, not just through the traditional route of marrying his children into local gentry families, but also using contracts and retaining "to bind to him important individuals of rank or domicile naturally beyond his ". Retainers were themselves then able—and expected—to raise their own tenants when required for a lords service; Salisbury relied on this in 1459 when those he summoned could themselves "call on tenants and friends in times of trouble." Tenants in general, argues Hicks, "bulked much larger in noble retinues of war than has been supposed" and themselves bought their household and tenantry with them: "every gentleman had his household and tenants to back him up". Lawyers were particularly useful to a lord, and Salisbury recruited among them heavily; they had a duty to attend his council meetings as well as represent him in court.

Hicks identifies different degrees of proximity to the earl through his retaining. Men such as John Conyers, James Strangways and Danby, for example, could be deemed "senior retainers" while others, including Thomas Whitham, John Middleton and John Ireland, would have been considered "lesser officials". They would often join Salisbury on royal commissions, such as in 1440 when William FitzHugh, Christopher Conyers and Robert Danby sat with the earl on an enquiry into a petition from the burgesses of Richmond, North Yorkshire. When the civil wars broke out again in 1459, many of his retainers "rode with Richard Earl of Salisbury and Sir John Neville", his son, to meet Richard, Duke of York at Ludlow Castle. Pollard has identified two broad groups of retainer for Salisbury. Firstly, men who were both geographically close to the nexus of earl's power at Middleham Castle and of social importance in the area—Conyers, FitzRandolph, Metcalfe, Mountford, Routh and Wandesford. Secondly—and to Pollard 'perhaps the more interesting' group—were those retainers of his who lived and operated in what he calls 'enemy territory'. That is, Neville of Brancepeth-controlled estates and those of the Percys. In the former were retainers such as Ralph Pullen and Thomas Lumley in Lower Weardale and Raby. The latter, retained in Percy territory included Robert Ogle of Morpeth, Northumberland, and John Middleton of Belsay. Lords though were not always fighting each other, and at such times their retainers likewise worked together. For example, even though it was little over a month before the Percy–Neville feud broke out into outright violence, in July 1453 James Strangways, Salisbury's man, was sheriff and oversaw the election of two Percy retainers to parliament, and the attestors contained a mix of sympathisers to both.

In the 15th century the North of England was effectively divided among four great landholders: between the crown (as duke of Lancaster), the Duke of York, the Percys and the Nevilles, headed by the Earl of Salisbury. Since the first two were absentee landlords, it was the latter pair who had regional political power, and by the 1450s Salisbury was the most powerful of them. Much of Salisbury's power came from his official position as warden of the west March: this effectively allowed him to raise and maintain a private army amon the local gentry—"the best natural source of fighting men in the country"—at the crown's expense. Comments Dockray that the earl

Salisbury, for their part, was not just a good opposition to them because of his great wealth, attractive though that must have been in terms of his ability to pay fees, but also for his direct contacts with the king's council and the royal family. Salisbury's retainers themselves interconnected, especially in Yorkshire. James Strangways married into the Darcy family, as did John Conyers of Hornby, and Boynton's connection with Fitzhugh probably led to Boynton's appointment as counsel for St Leonard's Hospital, York. Sir John Savile—Sheriff of Yorkshire in 1454—and married Salisbury's retainer Sir Thomas Harrington's daughter. Also, William Fitzhugh's son and heir married Salisbury's daughter Alice, and Sir John Langton, Sheriff of Yorkshire 1424, "had family connections with the Nevilles and Harringtons". Both Stockdale and Boynton, on the other hand, were retained by Salisbury and Lord Fizthugh, himself retained similarly. Likewise both Pickering and Savile had close connections with York as while being retained by Salisbury. Retained loyalties could be more powerful than presumed loyalties, such as to the crown. Some of the earl's connections may have been highly personal ones, given that in some cases they flourished under Salisbury but not did not continue under Warwick.

Hicks also notes the difficulties in ascertaining precise relationships, even though it is known they must have existed in great number; after all, he comments, a fragment of the Middleham receiver's roll of 1458–1459 indicates that the massive sum of 20% of income from the honour was spent on fees and retaining. Salisbury's heavy recruitment among Richmondshire families has been called his "Middleham Connection", as they often provided retainers over multiple generations. The Conyers' family tree, for example, argues Horrox, "is virtually a roll-call of the Neville retinue" in the mid-15th century. While some olf these fees were paid for life service, most were pro tempore, yet nonetheless extensive for being so. Another scholar has commented that, although Salisbury "virtually monopolised" the major Duchy of Lancaster offices in the area, "yet evidence to connect any of the West Riding gentry with these lords is embarrassingly slight".

Many of Salisbury's retainers and their families flourished under the subsequent Yorkist regime. in July 1462 Walter Strickland, for example, received a general pardon for all offences—up to and including treason and murder—committed under Henry VI. Richard Tunstall, nephew of John, became a squire of the body and later king's carver. Robert Percy became Comptroller of Edward IV's Household, while sons of the Birnands were esquires of the Household and John Pullen was appointed a serjeant of the cellar.

Salisbury's retaining and timeline of the political context

Notes

References

Works cited 

 
 
 
 
 
 
 
 
 
 
 
 
 
 
 
 
 
 
 
 
 
 
 
 
 
 
 
 
 
 
 
 
 
 
 
 
 
 
 
 
 
 
 
 
 
 
 
 
 
 
 
 
 
  
 
 
 
 
 
 
 
 
 
 
 
 
 
 
 
 
 
 
 
 
 
 
 
 
 
 
 
 
 
 
 
 
 
 
 

Earls of Salisbury (1337 creation)
Middle Ages by country
Feudalism in England
15th-century English people
Northern England
Affinity (law)
People of the Wars of the Roses